Katja Ebbinghaus (née Burgemeister, born 6 January 1948) is a former professional tennis player from Germany, active from 1969 to 1982. She reached five Grand Slam quarterfinals in singles, and a Grand Slam final in doubles, and played for West Germany in the Federation Cup in all but two years between 1970 and 1979.

Career
Ebbinghaus reached the final of the women's doubles at the 1974 French Open, partnering Gail Chanfreau. In the final, Chris Evert and Olga Morozova defeated them 6–4, 2–6, 6–1. In singles tournaments, she reached the quarterfinals of the French Open in 1972, 1973, and 1974; the quarterfinals of 1975 US Open, losing 3–6, 0–6 to Virginia Wade; and the quarter-finals of January 1977 Australian Open, losing 0–6, 4–6 to Kerry Reid.

Ebbinghaus played for West Germany in the Federation Cup in 1970 and from 1972 to 1975 and from 1977 to 1979, playing in the semifinals of the World Group in 1973 and 1974.

In 1977, when Evonne Goolagong made a return to tennis after the birth of her daughter, Ebbinghaus beat her in the first round of the Canadian Open.

Personal life
She married Dieter Ebbinghaus and they were divorced in 1974. In 1977, she moved from Munich, where she had lived for nine years, to Hamburg.

WTA Tour finals

Doubles: 3 runner-ups

References

External links
 
 
 

1948 births
Living people
West German female tennis players
Sportspeople from Karlsruhe
Tennis people from Baden-Württemberg